Asiwa is a small town and is the capital of Bosome Freho, a district in the Ashanti Region of Ghana.

Asiwa derives its name from activities of a settler from Kokofu. He nursed and planted cocoa seedlings for sale. Cocoa seedling is called NSIWAA. When people went there to buy cocoa nsiwaa (seedlings) they said they were going to Nsiwaa. This later changed to ASIWA.
A new Guest house has been built. It is called PAKAS LODGE. There is a multipurpose hall for workshops and conferences. A recreational centre to be called E. W. ANANE Recreational Centre is also being built near the lodge.
A new District Assembly Building has been inaugurated since 2016.

References

Populated places in the Ashanti Region